I Don't Like Mondays is a drama by Bosnian writer Zlatko Topčić. It won the PEN Austrian Center Award. Its 2009 premiere, directed by Austrian theater director Christian Papke, was performed at the International Theatre Festival MESS. 

The play received great ratings from audiences and critics. In 2010 the drama was published in German by Der Österreichische P.E.N.—Club, Vienna, and was printed in over eleven thousand copies.

References

2009 in theatre
Bosnia and Herzegovina culture
Bosnia and Herzegovina literature